Vasco Regini (born 9 September 1990) is an Italian professional footballer who plays as a left-back for  club Rimini.

Club career
Regini made his Serie A debut for Sampdoria on 9 May 2009 in a game against Reggina. He was successively acquired on loan by Lega Pro Prima Divisione club Foggia later in August 2010.

On 31 January 2020, he joined Parma on loan.

On 13 July 2021, he signed a one-year contract with Reggina. The contract was terminated by mutual consent on 31 January 2022.

On 26 August 2022, Regini signed a two-year deal with Rimini.

International career
Regini was a member of Italy U-20 team from 2008 to 2011. In 2011–12 season he played twice for Italy under-21 Serie B representative team plus another unofficial charity match against Italy U20. All three match Regini was the captain.

Career statistics

Club

References

External links
 FIGC 
 

1990 births
Living people
Association football defenders
Italian footballers
Serie B players
Serie A players
Serie C players
A.C. Cesena players
U.C. Sampdoria players
S.S.C. Napoli players
Calcio Foggia 1920 players
Empoli F.C. players
S.P.A.L. players
Parma Calcio 1913 players
Reggina 1914 players
Rimini F.C. 1912 players
People from Cesena
Italy youth international footballers
Italy under-21 international footballers
Footballers from Emilia-Romagna
Sportspeople from the Province of Forlì-Cesena